The Cuban bullfinch (Melopyrrha nigra) is a songbird species of the genus Melopyrrha. It is a member of the tanager family Thraupidae and belongs to the subfamily Coerebinae which also includes the Darwin's finches.

Distribution and habitat
It is found on and endemic to Cuba. Its natural habitats are subtropical or tropical moist lowland forest, subtropical or tropical moist montane forest, and heavily degraded former forest. It is considered a near threatened species by the IUCN.

Taxonomy
The Cuban bullfinch was formally described by the Swedish naturalist Carl Linnaeus in 1758 in the tenth edition of his Systema Naturae under the binomial name Loxia nigra. Linnaeus based his short description on Mark Catesby's "The Little Black Bullfinch" and Eleazar Albin's "Black Bullfinch ". The type location is Cuba. The specific epithet nigra is Latin meaning "black". The Cuban bullfinch is now one of three species placed in the genus Melopyrrha that was introduced in 1853 by the French naturalist Charles Lucien Bonaparte. The Grand Cayman bullfinch (M. taylori) found on the Cayman Islands was once considered a subspecies, but is now considered a full species by IUCN and BirdLife International.

References

External links
Stamp photo (for Cuba); Article page
Cuban Bullfinch photo gallery VIREO; Photo-(linked at natureserve.org)

Finches
Melopyrrha
Birds described in 1758
Taxa named by Carl Linnaeus
Taxonomy articles created by Polbot
Endemic birds of Cuba